Elena Nestorovna Mikhnenko (1922–1993) was the daughter of the Ukrainian anarchist revolutionaries Nestor Makhno and Halyna Kuzmenko.

Biography

On 30 October 1922, Elena Mikhnenko was born in Pawiak prison, where her mother Halyna Kuzmenko was being held, while her father Nestor Makhno was himself imprisoned in Mokotów Prison. The strain of life in exile caused the family to quickly fall apart, with Makhno and Kuzmenko frequently separating. Elena would spend most of her early years with her mother, rarely ever seeing her father.

In 1925, the family moved to Paris, where Elena would spend most of her formative years.  The families of French anarchists often looked after the young Elena, giving her the Francized pet name of "Lucie". She thus grew up speaking the French language, eventually forgetting how to speak Russian and never even learning how to speak Ukrainian. In 1929, Elena was taken on holiday by her father to the southern coastal town of Aimargues, which was well-known for its relatively large anarchist community. Sick and in poverty, her father was financially supported by the French anarchist movement, but spent most of this money on Elena. In March 1934, her father finally succumbed to his tuberculosis, leaving his daughter with the final words "be healthy and happy, my daughter", before he died in his sleep. Due to her father's political activities, Elena came to reject politics at a young age, pledging that she would "take no interest in politics or newspapers". 

In 1939, Elena graduated from secondary school. But following the Nazi invasion of France, she was conscripted into forced labour and transferred to Berlin. On 14 August 1945, after the fall of Berlin, she was then arrested by the Soviets and transferred to Kyiv. While imprisoned in the Ukrainian capital, she slapped a fellow inmate after they asked if her father was "the renowned bandit".

She was eventually sentenced to five years for "anti-Soviet agitation" and subsequently exiled to Jambyl, in the Kazakh Soviet Socialist Republic. While surveilled by the authorities, she turned to manual labour in the city's canteens, factories and pig farms, but was often dismissed after her employers learnt that her father was Nestor Makhno. This fact also kept her single for most of her life, as men would often leave her upon discovering her father's identity. Following the death of Stalin, she was joined in Jambyl by her mother, but it had been so long since they'd been together that they did not recognize each other upon Kuzmenko's arrival.

In 1968, Elena reluctantly accepted to be interviewed by the Russian historian , who described her as "edgy, irritated and trusted no one." During the interview, Elena reportedly spoke Russian with a thick Parisian accent. She declared that she felt she had no homeland, neither in France nor the Soviet Union, but nevertheless asked Semanov to send her some French newspapers, which she was unable to get in Kazakhstan. 

Elena remained unmarried and childless into old age, declaring that she never wanted children, as she feared they would "share the same fate as me". She eventually enrolled at the city's Hydro-Melioration Institute, where she worked until her death. In 1993, Elena Mikhnenko died in Jambyl, at the age of 71.

References

Bibliography
 
 
 
 

1922 births
1993 deaths
Forced labourers under German rule during World War II
French people of Ukrainian descent
People from Warsaw
Prisoners and detainees of the Soviet Union
Ukrainian exiles
Ukrainian expatriates in Kazakhstan
Ukrainian people imprisoned abroad
Ukrainian prisoners and detainees
Ukrainian victims of human rights abuses